Acacia distans is a tree belonging to the genus Acacia and the subgenus Juliflorae that is endemic to arid parts of western Australia.

Description
It has slender glabrous slender and sometimes pendulous branchlets with sericeous new shoots with hairs that become silver with age. Like most species of Acacia it has phyllodes rather than true leaves. It blooms between March to May and produces yellow flowers.

Distribution
It is native to an area in the Pilbara and Mid West regions of Western Australia where it is commonly found in river beds, hardpans and  floodplains where it grows in loam, clay, alluvium and red sandy soils. It has a discontinuous distribution and is often found around the headwaters and upper catchment areas of the Fortescue, Gascyone and Murchison Rivers where it is found on alluvial plains growing in loamy soils as a part of low woodland or shrubland communities and are known to form pure stands.

See also
List of Acacia species

References

distans
Acacias of Western Australia
Plants described in 1983
Taxa named by Bruce Maslin